Lacistodes is a genus of moths in the family Gelechiidae.

Species
 Lacistodes brunneostola Janse, 1960
 Lacistodes fuscomaculata Bidzilya & Mey, 2011
 Lacistodes tauropis Meyrick, 1921

References

Pexicopiini